Th.O.I Avgorou is a Cypriot football club based in Avgorou, Cyprus. Founded in 1960, it played sometimes in Third and in Fourth Division. The club has also a women's volleyball team that takes part in Cyprus Women's Volleyball Division 1.

References

Football clubs in Cyprus
Association football clubs established in 1954
1954 establishments in Cyprus
Volleyball clubs in Cyprus